The Upriver Residential District is a  historic district in Natchez, Mississippi that was listed on the U.S. National Register of Historic Places in 1983.  It includes Colonial Revival, Late Victorian, Queen Anne, and other architecture, and has significance dating to 1790.  It includes 389 contributing buildings.
Its border was defined, on the south and west, by the borders of the already-NRHP-listed Natchez On-Top-of-the-Hill Historic District (essentially Monroe Street) and the Downriver Residential Historic District.

It includes the John Dicks House, which is believed to be the only work of McKim, Mead, and White in Mississippi and "one of the most outstanding Colonial Revival buildings in the state."

See also
There are several other NRHP-listed historic districts in Natchez:
Clifton Heights Historic District, adjacent on the river side
Natchez On-Top-of-the-Hill Historic District, adjacent on the south, below Monroe St.
Downriver Residential Historic District, further south below the On-Top-of-the-Hill district
Natchez Bluffs and Under-the-Hill Historic District, on river side of On-Top-of-the-Hill
Cemetery Bluff District
Holy Family Catholic Church Historic District
Woodlawn Historic District

References 

Victorian architecture in Mississippi
Queen Anne architecture in Mississippi
Colonial Revival architecture in Mississippi
Historic districts in Natchez, Mississippi
Historic districts on the National Register of Historic Places in Mississippi
National Register of Historic Places in Natchez, Mississippi